Gymnochrome E is a cytotoxic phenanthroperylenequinone isolated from a deep-water crinoid called Holopus rangii.

Notes
Gymnochromes E and F, cytotoxic phenanthroperylenequinones from a deep-water crinoid, Holopus rangii

Biomolecules